Tilak Ram Tharu (born 10 April 1993, in Narayani Zone) is a Nepalese track and field athlete who represented Nepal at the 2012 Summer Olympics in the men's 100 metres. He was eliminated in the preliminaries but set a personal best time of 10.85 seconds.

References

External links
 

Living people
1993 births
People from Chitwan District
Nepalese male sprinters
Athletes (track and field) at the 2012 Summer Olympics
Olympic athletes of Nepal
Athletes (track and field) at the 2010 Summer Youth Olympics
Athletes (track and field) at the 2010 Asian Games
Athletes (track and field) at the 2014 Asian Games
Asian Games competitors for Nepal
21st-century Nepalese people